Signal recognition particle 9 is a protein that in humans is encoded by the SRP9 gene.

References

Further reading

External links 
 PDBe-KB provides an overview of all the structure information available in the PDB for Human Signal recognition particle 9 kDa protein